William Joseph Nealon Jr. (July 31, 1923 – August 30, 2018) was an American jurist who was United States district judge of the United States District Court for the Middle District of Pennsylvania. He was the last judicial appointee from the Kennedy administration remaining on the federal bench and among the longest-serving federal judges in history, with over 26 years of active service and nearly 56 years of total service.

Education and career

Born on July 31, 1923, in Scranton, Pennsylvania, Nealon was a First Lieutenant in the United States Marine Corps during World War II, from 1942 to 1945. He received a Bachelor of Science degree from Villanova University in 1947 and a Bachelor of Laws from the Columbus School of Law at the Catholic University of America in 1950. He was in private practice in Scranton from 1951 to 1960, also lecturing at the University of Scranton from 1951 to 1959. He was a hearing examiner for the Pennsylvania Liquor Control Board from 1955 to 1959. He was a judge on the Lackawanna County Court of Common Pleas from 1960 to 1962.

Federal judicial service

On December 13, 1962, Nealon received a recess appointment from President John F. Kennedy to a seat on the United States District Court for the Middle District of Pennsylvania vacated by John W. Murphy. Formally nominated on January 15, 1963, Nealon was confirmed by the United States Senate on March 15, 1963, and received his commission on March 27, 1963. He served as Chief Judge from 1976 to 1989, assuming senior status on January 1, 1989, and died on August 30, 2018, in Scranton.

Honor

The William J. Nealon Federal Building and United States Courthouse, located in Scranton, is named in his honor.

See also
 List of United States federal judges by longevity of service

References

Sources
 

1923 births
2018 deaths
People from Scranton, Pennsylvania
Military personnel from Pennsylvania
Villanova University alumni
Columbus School of Law alumni
Judges of the Pennsylvania Courts of Common Pleas
Judges of the United States District Court for the Middle District of Pennsylvania
United States district court judges appointed by John F. Kennedy
20th-century American judges
United States Marine Corps officers